"Imaginationland" may refer to:
Imaginationland: The Movie (South Park) (2008), compilation of three South Park episodes
"Imaginationland Episode I", an episode of South Park
"Imaginationland Episode II", an episode of South Park
"Imaginationland Episode III", an episode of South Park